David Elieser Deutsch  (born 18 May 1953) is a British physicist at the University of Oxford. He is a Visiting Professor in the Department of Atomic and Laser Physics at the Centre for Quantum Computation (CQC) in the Clarendon Laboratory of the University of Oxford. He pioneered the field of quantum computation by formulating a description for a quantum Turing machine, as well as specifying an algorithm designed to run on a quantum computer. He has also proposed the use of entangled states and Bell's theorem for quantum key distribution and is a proponent of the many-worlds interpretation of quantum mechanics.

Early life and education
Deutsch was born into a Jewish family in Haifa, Israel on 18 May 1953, the son of Oskar and Tikva Deutsch. In London, David attended Geneva House school in Cricklewood (his parents owned and ran the Alma restaurant on Cricklewood Broadway), followed by William Ellis School in Highgate (then a voluntary aided school in north London) before reading Natural Sciences at Clare College, Cambridge and taking Part III of the Mathematical Tripos. He went on to Wolfson College, Oxford for his doctorate in theoretical physics and wrote his thesis on quantum field theory in curved space-time supervised by Dennis Sciama and Philip Candelas.

Career and research
His work on quantum algorithms began with a 1985 paper, later expanded in 1992 along with Richard Jozsa to produce the Deutsch–Jozsa algorithm, one of the first examples of a quantum algorithm that is exponentially faster than any possible deterministic classical algorithm. In his 1985 paper, he also suggests the use of entangled states and Bell's theorem for quantum key distribution. In his nomination for election as a Fellow of the Royal Society (FRS) in 2008, his contributions were described as:

"[having] laid the foundations of the quantum theory of computation, and has subsequently made or participated in many of the most important advances in the field, including the discovery of the first quantum algorithms, the theory of quantum logic gates and quantum computational networks, the first quantum error-correction scheme, and several fundamental quantum universality results. He has set the agenda for worldwide research efforts in this new, interdisciplinary field, made progress in understanding its philosophical implications (via a variant of the many-universes interpretation) and made it comprehensible to the general public, notably in his book The Fabric of Reality."

Since 2012, he has been working on constructor theory, an attempt at generalizing the quantum theory of computation to cover not just computation but all physical processes. Together with Chiara Marletto, he published a paper in December 2014 entitled Constructor theory of information, that conjectures that information can be expressed solely in terms of which transformations of physical systems are possible and which are impossible.

The Fabric of Reality

In his 1997 book The Fabric of Reality, Deutsch details his "Theory of Everything". It aims not at the reduction of everything to particle physics, but rather mutual support among multiversal, computational, epistemological, and evolutionary principles. His theory of everything is somewhat emergentist rather than reductive. There are four strands to his theory:

 Hugh Everett's many-worlds interpretation of quantum physics, "the first and most important of the four strands."
 Karl Popper's epistemology, especially its anti-inductivism and requiring a realist (non-instrumental) interpretation of scientific theories, as well as its emphasis on taking seriously those bold conjectures that resist falsification.
 Alan Turing's theory of computation, especially as developed in Deutsch's Turing principle, in which the Universal Turing machine is replaced by Deutsch's universal quantum computer. ("The theory of computation is now the quantum theory of computation.")
 Richard Dawkins' refinement of Darwinian evolutionary theory and the modern evolutionary synthesis, especially the ideas of replicator and meme as they integrate with Popperian problem-solving (the epistemological strand).

Invariants 
In a 2009 TED talk, Deutsch expounded a criterion for scientific explanation, which is to formulate invariants: "State an explanation [publicly, so that it can be dated and verified by others later] that remains invariant [in the face of apparent change, new information, or unexpected conditions]".
 "A bad explanation is easy to vary."
 "The search for hard-to-vary explanations is the origin of all progress"
 "That  is the most important fact about the physical world."

Invariance as a fundamental aspect of a scientific account of reality had long been part of philosophy of science: for example, Friedel Weinert's book The Scientist as Philosopher (2004) noted the presence of the theme in many writings from around 1900 onward, such as works by Henri Poincaré (1902), Ernst Cassirer (1920), Max Born (1949 and 1953), Paul Dirac (1958), Olivier Costa de Beauregard (1966), Eugene Wigner (1967), Lawrence Sklar (1974), Michael Friedman (1983), John D. Norton (1992), Nicholas Maxwell (1993), Alan Cook (1994), Alistair Cameron Crombie (1994), Margaret Morrison (1995), Richard Feynman (1997), Robert Nozick (2001), and Tim Maudlin (2002).

The Beginning of Infinity

Deutsch's second book, The Beginning of Infinity: Explanations that Transform the World, was published on 31 March 2011. In this book, he views the European Enlightenment of the 17th and 18th centuries as near the beginning of a potentially unending sequence of purposeful knowledge creation. He examines the nature of knowledge, memes, and how and why creativity evolved in humans.

Awards and honours
The Fabric of Reality was shortlisted for the Rhone-Poulenc science book award in 1998.
Deutsch was awarded the Dirac Prize of the Institute of Physics in 1998, and the Edge of Computation Science Prize in 2005. In 2017, he received the Dirac Medal of the International Centre for Theoretical Physics (ICTP). Deutsch is linked to Paul Dirac through his doctoral advisor Dennis Sciama, whose doctoral advisor was Dirac. Deutsch was elected a Fellow of the Royal Society (FRS) in 2008. In 2020 he was awarded an Honorary Fellowship of the Cybernetics Society. In 2018, he received the Micius Quantum Prize. In 2021, he was awarded the Isaac Newton Medal and Prize.

On September 22, 2022, he was awarded with the Breakthrough Prize in fundamental physics (sharing it with 3 others)

Personal life
Deutsch is a founding member of the parenting and educational method Taking Children Seriously. Deutsch supported Brexit, with his advocacy regularly being quoted by the then government adviser, Dominic Cummings.

See also
 Deutsch gate
 Wigner's friend
 Quantum cellular automaton
 Quantum mechanics of time travel

References

External links 

 
 
 

People from Haifa
Israeli Jews
Israeli physicists
Israeli writers
Israeli computer scientists
Quantum computing
British Jews
British physicists
British atheists
1953 births
Jewish atheists
Israeli atheists
Jewish physicists
Living people
Fellows of the British Computer Society
Fellows of the Royal Society
Theoretical physicists
People educated at William Ellis School
Alumni of Clare College, Cambridge
Alumni of Wolfson College, Oxford
Academics of the University of Oxford
Quantum physicists
Quantum information scientists